Chengdu Rongcheng Football Club is a Chinese professional football club based in Chengdu, Sichuan and their home stadium is the Chengdu Phoenix Hill Football Stadium that has a seating capacity of 50,695. The club currently participates in the Chinese Super League division under licence from the Chinese Football Association (CFA). The clubs founder and their majority shareholder is Chengdu Better City Investment Group Co., Ltd.

History
The club was founded on 7 March 2018 by Chengdu Better City Investment Group Co., Ltd. on the ashes of the dissolved Chengdu Qbao. With the support from the Chengdu Football Association and the appointment of José Carlos Granero as their Head coach the club would start their journey playing within the Chengdu FA Champions League. After winning the division the club would participate within the 2018 Chinese Champions League where they came runners-up to Taizhou Yuanda and promotion to the third tier of the Chinese football pyramid. Consecutive promotions would follow after finishing as runners-up to Shenyang Urban  and promotion to the second-tier (China League One) at the end of the 2019 China League Two season.

In the 2020 China League One campaign the club came fourth in their debut season in the second tier and the Head José Carlos Granero decided not renew his contract with the club, despite his achievements with the team. South Korean coach Seo Jung-won would be appointed as their new Head coach for the start of the 2021 China League One campaign. On 15 January 2021, the club changed their name to Chengdu Rongcheng F.C. to comply with the Chinese Football Association's request of teams having neutral names. On 12 January 2022, Chengdu was promoted to the Chinese Super League after beating Dalian Pro 2-1 on aggregate in the promotion/relegation play-offs.

Name history
2018–2020 Chengdu Better City F.C. 成都兴城
2021–     Chengdu Rongcheng F.C. 成都蓉城

Current squad

First team

Reserve squad

Out on loan

Managerial history
  José Carlos Granero (2018–2020)
  Seo Jung-won (2021–)

Results
All-time league rankings

As of the end of 2019 season.

 Promoted by beating Dalian Pro in the promotion play-offs.
Key
 Pld = Played
 W = Games won
 D = Games drawn
 L = Games lost
 F = Goals for
 A = Goals against
 Pts = Points
 Pos = Final position

 DNQ = Did not qualify
 DNE = Did not enter
 NH = Not Held
 – = Does Not Exist
 R1 = Round 1
 R2 = Round 2
 R3 = Round 3
 R4 = Round 4

 F = Final
 SF = Semi-finals
 QF = Quarter-finals
 R16 = Round of 16
 Group = Group stage
 GS2 = Second Group stage
 QR1 = First Qualifying Round
 QR2 = Second Qualifying Round
 QR3 = Third Qualifying Round

References

Football clubs in Chengdu